David Hilbert (1862–1943) was a German mathematician.

Hilbert may also refer to:

Places
 12022 Hilbert, an asteroid
 Hilbert (crater), on the Moon
 Hilbert, West Virginia, an unincorporated community
 Hilbert, Wisconsin, a village
 Hilbert Wildlife Management Area, West Virginia

Other uses
 Hilbert (name), listing people with Hilbert as a given or family name
 USS Hilbert (DE-742), a US Navy destroyer escort of World War II
 Hilbert College, Hamburg, New York
 Hilbert High School, Hilbert, Wisconsin

See also 
 Hibbert, a surname